Dionysiou Monastery is an Eastern Orthodox monastery at the monastic state of Mount Athos in Greece in southwest part of Athos peninsula. The monastery ranks fifth in the hierarchy of the Athonite monasteries. It is one of the twenty self-governing monasteries in Athos, and it was dedicated to John the Baptist.

History

The monastery was founded in the 14th century by Saint , and it was named after him. The brother of Dionysius of Korisos was the metropolitan of Trebizond at the time. Alexios III Komnenos of Trebizond was the main benefactor of the monastery during its founding. His chrysobull from September 1374 is currently kept in the archives of Dionysiou Monastery. A passage from the chrysobull states that:

By the end of the 15th century, the Russian pilgrim Isaiah confirms that, the monastery was Serbian.

The library of the monastery housed 804 manuscripts and more than 4,000 printed books. The oldest manuscripts come from the 11th century.

Today the monastery has a community of around 50 monks.

Notable people 
 Nephon II of Constantinople
 Saint Joseph of Dionysiou (d. 17 February 1819)
 Arsenios the Cave Dweller (resident from 1980–1983)

List of abbots
 Dositheos of Dionysiou (abbot until 1936)
 Elder Gabriel Dionysiatis (or Gabriel of Dionysiou, 1886–6 November 1983), Abbot of Dionysiou Monastery for 40 years during the mid-1900s
 Elder Haralambos Dionysiatis (or Charalambos of Dionysiou, 1886–6 November 1983), Abbot of Dionysiou Monastery from 1979 to 2000
 Peter of Dionysiou (current abbot)

Manuscripts 
 Codex Athous Dionysiou = Uncial 045 (Ω)
 Uncial 050

Gallery

References

External links 

 Dionysiou monastery at the Mount Athos website.
 Greek Ministry of Culture: Holy Monastery of Dionysiou.

 
Christian monasteries established in the 14th century
Monasteries on Mount Athos
Greek Orthodox monasteries